Gene Jones (born September 22, 1957) is an American professional golfer who currently plays on the Champions Tour. 

Jones was born in High Point, North Carolina. He turned professional in 1975. He had nine victories in various venues in his career through 2009.

Jones became eligible to play on the Champions Tour after reaching the age of fifty in September 2007. In his first two seasons, he had four second-place finishes.

Professional wins (9)
1993 Greater Erie Charity Golf Classic
2005 South Carolina Senior Open, Grapefruit Open
2006 Grapefruit Open
2007 South Carolina Senior Open, Patriot Invitational
2008 South Carolina Senior Open, Patriot Invitational, North Florida Senior PGA Championship

See also
1992 PGA Tour Qualifying School graduates

References

External links
Gene Jones - Golf FanHouse

American male golfers
PGA Tour Champions golfers
Golfers from North Carolina
Golfers from Orlando, Florida
Sportspeople from High Point, North Carolina
1957 births
Living people